Battle of Stockach may refer to:
Battle of Stockach (1799)
Battle of Stockach (1800)